Sweden held a general election on 20 September 1964.

Results

Regional results
The results of the various constituency coalitions between the centre-right parties have all been listed under "C/F/H".

Percentage share

By votes

Constituency results
The results of the various constituency coalitions between the centre-right parties have all been listed under "C/F/H".

Percentage share

By votes

References

General elections in Sweden